Saint-Hilaire (2016 population: 252) is a former Canadian village in Madawaska County, New Brunswick. It is now part of Haut-Madawaska.

The legal spelling of the name was St. Hilaire but this was used only sporadically by the provincial government.

The largest employer is a composting plant.

History and geography

The municipality was constituted on 2 October 1967.  It consists of a mayor and three councillors.

The Saint John river valley is cut between two sets of peaks.  The town is roughly 200m above sea level, while a peak of roughly 1000m is seen nearby.  Frenchville, Maine is across the river.  The steel truss Clair – Fort Kent Bridge is upriver about five miles, while downstream the next border crossing is the Edmundston–Madawaska Bridge (also a steel truss).

Economy

The nearest post office is upriver in Baker Brook.  A railway and NB Route 120 go through town, as well as the Saint John River.  The elementary school closed in 1996 due to lack of students.  The Caisse Populaire Trois-Rives maintains a branch.  The nearest Royal Canadian Mounted Police detachment is in Clair, New Brunswick, while the nearest hospital is located in Edmundston.

Demographics

Population

Language

Notable people

See also
List of communities in New Brunswick
List of crossings of the Saint John River

References

External links

Communities in Madawaska County, New Brunswick
Former villages in New Brunswick